The 2022–23 Morehead State Eagles men's basketball team represents Morehead State University in the 2022–23 NCAA Division I men's basketball season. The Eagles, led by sixth-year head coach Preston Spradlin, play their home games at Ellis Johnson Arena in Morehead, Kentucky as members of the Ohio Valley Conference.

With a 69–63 victory against Eastern Illinois, Morehead State clinched its second outright Ohio Valley Conference regular-season title, and first since the 1983–84 season. Though they lost to Southeast Missouri State in the OVC tournament semifinals, the Eagles received an automatic bid to the NIT, their first NIT participation. In the NIT, Morehead Stated upset No. 1 seed Clemson in the first round before being defeated by UAB in the second round.

Previous season
The Eagles finished the 2021–22 season 23–11, 13–5 in OVC play to finish in third place. They defeated Tennessee Tech and Belmont, before falling to Murray State in the championship game of the OVC tournament.

Roster

Schedule and results

|-
!colspan=12 style=""| Non-conference regular season

|-
!colspan=12 style=""| Ohio Valley regular season

|-
!colspan=9 style=| Ohio Valley tournament

|-
!colspan=9 style=| NIT 

Sources

References

Morehead State Eagles men's basketball seasons
Morehead State Eagles
Morehead State Eagles men's basketball
Morehead State Eagles men's basketball
Morehead State